Christian Pfeiffer (20 April 1970 – 12 March 2022) was a German motorcycle stunt rider and multiple time world champion (2003, 2007, 2008 and 2009). He was a four-time winner of the prestigious Red Bull Scramble (1996, 1997, 2000 and 2004) and he also broke many Guinness World Records during his 20-year professional career as a rider. He was also a four time European Championship winner (2004, 2006, 2007 and 2010).

Career 
Pfeiffer inherited the passion for his motorcycle riding from his father at a young age and his father gifted him a modified bike when he was only five years old. He learnt the art of freestyle biking stunts at the age of 10. At the age of 10, in 1980, he won his first ever trial race on a motorcross bike. He took up stunt riding to prolong his career in the mid-1990s. In 1985, Pfeiffer won the West German national title at junior level in the motocross event at the age of 15. At the age of 18, he won the OMK Cup which is a German National Championship for B license holders.

His most notable world record came in 1997 when he successfully jumped over 33 people lying next to each other without the use of a ramp. In 1999, two years later he attempted to break his own world record but he suffered severe complicated fractures due to a technical fault.

He played a key part in transforming the image of BMW in the late 2000s. He became a world champion for the first time in 2003. In 2004, he pulled off a 115 degree wheelie during 'Stuntwars' contest held in Florida and his stunt surprised the viewers that how such stunt can be possible on a bike. He became a European championship winner for the first time in 2004. He won the Florida Stuntwars in 2006.

The BMW F800R was first introduced when Chris Pfeiffer started using the custom bike for his tricks. Pfeiffer first started using a BMW F800S in January 2006, and eventually transformed the S into an R model in order to lighten the weight of the bike and make it more suitable for motorcycle stunt riding. In honor of Pfeiffer, BMW started offering a limited edition of 68 Chris-Pfeiffer-Edition BMW F800R models, which has custom paintwork and an Akrapovič exhaust.

He travelled all around the world to complete and to promote stunt riding for free of charge. In his professional career, he travelled to approximately 94 countries. During his visits to various countries, he had exhibited various stunts including high chair wheelies, no hand wheelies, stoppies, circular wheelies, rolling and burnouts.

He remains the only person in history to have scaled the level three climb at Via Tina in Arco, Italy on his bike. During his playing career, he worked alongside Hollywood actor Tom Cruise and skateboarder Tony Hawk. He won the Red Bull Scramble four times, achieving this feat with the final victory having come in Austria. He rode his last stunt riding contest in 2010. He announced his retirement from the sport in 2015 in order to spend quality time with his family.

Death 
Pfeiffer died by suicide on 12 March 2022. His death was announced three days later. He had been suffering from depression.  He was 51.

References 

1970 births
2022 deaths
2022 suicides
German motorcycle racers
People from Weilheim-Schongau
Sportspeople from Upper Bavaria
Suicides in Germany